Ready To Run is the debut and only album by former Fame Academy contestant Sinéad Quinn. It was poorly received and charted at No. 48 on the UK Albums Chart, which led to her being dropped by her record label.

Track listing
 "What You Need Is..." - 3:31 (Sinéad Quinn, Pete Glenister, Deni Lew)
 "Never Happy" - 3:39 (Quinn, Glenister, Lew)
 "Don't Give It Up Girl" - 3:31 (Quinn, Glenister, Lew)
 "Ready To Run" - 4:17 (Quinn, Glenister, Lew)
 "I Can't Break Down" - 3:31 (Quinn, Glenister, Lew)
 "Fire Me Up" - 3:38 (Quinn, Tore Johansson)
 "Small Town Big Dreams" - 4:10 (Quinn, Glenister, Lew)
 "I'm Worth It" - 4:30 (Quinn, Glenister, Lew)
 "Overkill" - 3:45 (Quinn, Glenister, Lew)
 "Lucky Escape" - 4:03 (Quinn, Glenister, Lew)
 "Love Me All The Way" - 3:59 (Quinn, Phil Thornalley, Dave Munday)
 "Safe Hands" - 3:08 (Quinn, Phil Thornalley, Dave Munday)

Charts

References

Sinéad Quinn albums
2003 albums